Perry Park is a 5,000-capacity sporting ground located in the Brisbane suburb of Bowen Hills. Perry Park is home to the Brisbane Strikers, which plays in the National Premier Leagues Queensland.

Perry Park is owned by Brisbane City Council, and managed by the YMCA, who run facilities in the complex. Brisbane Strikers hold a sub-lease from the YMCA.

History
Scotsman William Raff was granted ownership of the land in 1857. He then subdivided the land in 1875, and the lot where Perry Park is now situated was sold to William Perry, among three other lots. Mr Perry was a prominent Brisbane ironmonger. He used the land essentially as his family cattle and horse paddock.

In the 1940s it was used as a base for the Z Special Unit of the Australian, British and New Zealand armed forces for their 1943 raid on Japanese occupied Singapore harbour. The ground was the home of Mayne Football Club and Valleys Cricket Club from 1925 to 1942 and 1948 to 1967.

Brisbane City Council acquired the land for soccer grounds in 1967 and converted the oval into two rectangular pitches with the main pitch along Abbotsford Road allocated as the main Perry Park stadium.

In 1977, Perry Park Stadium hosted its first National Soccer League (NSL) game between Brisbane City and Sydney club Marconi Fairfield.

Perry Park hosted its sole international football match on 20 September 1992, when the Australian national football team hosted Tahiti in a 1994 FIFA World Cup qualifier, as part of the Oceania Football Confederation qualifying draw.

Brisbane Strikers 
The ground is home to the Brisbane Strikers; however the Strikers did not play all of its home games there during its reign in the National Soccer League (alternating between Lang Park (now Suncorp Stadium), Ballymore and Perry Park). The club now plays all of its home games at Perry Park in the National Premier Leagues Queensland.

In 2016, the Strikers hosted Melbourne City in the FFA Cup, losing 1-2 in the Round of 16 in front of a sell-out 3571 crowd (the crowd being capped due to security concerns). The match was Tim Cahill's first in City colours.

The following year, the Strikers hosted former NSL club Heidelberg United in the 2017 National Premier Leagues final. The Strikers lost 0-2 in front of a crowd of 1105.
As part of the Strikers' aborted bid for an A-League licence in 2018, the club produced plans for a complete rebuild of the facility, which would have seen the current Bill Waddell stand demolished and the pitched moved to the east to accommodate a 15,694-seat boutique stadium.

References

External links

Brisbane Strikers
Sports venues in Brisbane
Soccer venues in Queensland
Bowen Hills, Queensland
A-League Women stadiums